The Strojnik S-2 is an American high-wing, single-seat motor glider that was designed and built by Aleš Strojnik.

Design and development
Strojnik completed and flew his S-2 design in 1980.

The S-2 is of mixed construction. The  span wings consist of fiberglass skins built around a carbon fiber and aluminium spars. The wings employ a Wortmann FX 67-170/17 airfoil and have flaps for glidepath control. The wings are a constant chord design, with tapered wing tips. The fuselage is a pod-and-boom design, with the cockpit area made from wood, covered in fiberglass and the tail boom made from aluminium. The tail surfaces are of carbon fiber structure, covered in fiberglass. The powerplant is a Kohler Company engine of  that drives a folding two-bladed propeller. The engine is mounted in pusher configuration behind the cockpit, with the tail boom running underneath the propeller. The landing gear consists of two small wheels mounted in tandem on the fuselage centerline.

A two-seat version with the same external dimensions was reportedly under development in 1983.

Strojnik reported that 22 sets of plans had been sold by 1983.

Operational history
Strojnik earned his silver badge flying the S-2. The prototype S-2 is no longer on the Federal Aviation Administration registry, but at least eight were built and in July 2011 six remain on the US register, including three S-2s and three S-2As.

Variants
S-2
Initial version
S-2A
Improved version
S-4 "Laminar Magic"
One-off, registration number N85AS. Smaller, short-wing version, which set a US national aviation speed record in FAI Category C-1a/0 (European microlight, under 300kg gross weight) in 1987.
S-5
One-off aircraft, registration number N51152. Added slightly greater wingspan to existing S-4 fuselage for better performance in recreational flying.

Specifications (S-2)

See also

References

External links
S-2A photos

1980s United States sailplanes
Homebuilt aircraft
Aircraft first flown in 1980
Motor gliders
Single-engined pusher aircraft
High-wing aircraft